Resonant energy transfer may refer to:
Förster resonance energy transfer
Resonant inductive coupling